Vehkalammen kenttä is a sports ground in Jyväskylä in Finland, the home ground of bandy club Jyväskylän Seudun Palloseura.

Bandy venues in Finland
Sport in Jyväskylä